Brandon Reilly is the name of:

Brandon Reilly (musician) (born 1981), lead singer and guitarist of the band Nightmare of You
Brandon Reilly (American football) (born 1993), wide receiver